Jakub Josef Dominik Malý, pseudonyms: Budislav, Václav Pravda and K.Z. (4 August 1811, Prague - 7 March 1885, Prague) was a Czech historian, writer and journalist.

Life and work
The son of a middle-class family, he graduated from the philosophical and law faculties at Charles University. He was influenced by the teachings of Ignaz Cornova, Bernard Bolzano and Josef Jungmann, moved in patriotic and literary circles, and occasionally served as a tutor for noble families.

As a supporter of the Czech National Revival and pan-Slavism, tempered by distrust of the Russians, he emphasized the importance of the Czech language , supposedly dating from the 8th century, which became a major symbol for the nationalist movement.

During the 1830s, he published articles and opinions in numerous conservative patriotic newspapers, and helped Jungmann to create his German-Czech dictionary. He also wrote poetry and some drama. From 1835 to 1844, he edited the Knihovna Populární Literatury (Library of Popular Literature), which included translations from foreign authors. Toward the end of the 1850s, he was employed by František Ladislav Rieger, as an editor for his Czech national cyclopedia, Slovník naučný.

Among his major works were National Bohemian Tales and Legends (Národní české pohádky a pověsti), History of the Czech Nation for Readers of all Classes (Dějepis národu českého pro čtenáře každého stavu) and his Memoirs and Reflections of an Old Patriot (Vzpomínky a úvahy starého vlastence). He also translated eleven plays by Shakespeare and was the first to translate Charles Dickens into Czech.

Sources

External links 

 Works by and about Malý @ the National Library of the Czech Republic 
 

1811 births
1885 deaths
Czech journalists
19th-century Czech historians
Czech nationalists
Writers from Prague